The Ancient City of Bosra is an archaeological site located in the city of Bosra, Syria. The site illustrates the Roman, Byzantine and Muslim civilizations, and is inscribed by UNESCO in the list of World Heritage.

History 
Bosra, once the capital of the Roman province of Arabia, was an important stopover on the ancient caravan route to Mecca. A magnificent 2nd-century Roman theatre, early Christian ruins and several mosques are found within its great walls.

UNESCO World Heritage 
In 1980, the Ancient City of Bosra was listed as a UNESCO World Heritage site, following the criteria (i), (iii) and (vi). The protected area is of 116.2 ha, while the buffer zone comprehends 200.4 ha.

However, in 2017, the site was inscribed in the list of World Heritage in Danger, because of armed conflict in the country.

Sources

References